The men's 200 metres competition of the athletics events at the 2019 Pan American Games will take place between the 8 and 9 of August at the 2019 Pan American Games Athletics Stadium. The defending Pan American Games champion is Andre De Grasse from Canada.

Summary
10 years off his greatest success, returning bronze medalist Alonso Edward was the early leader, burning the turn with Reynier Mena making up the stagger on Álex Quiñónez to his outside, the next contender and Jerome Blake on the far outside.  From dead last mid-turn, Quiñónez began to gain as they came off the turn.  At a much faster cadence, he passed Edward 50 metres from the finish and was off for gold.  On the far inside, Jereem Richards also accelerated and was catching people from behind.  And last onto the home stretch, Yancarlos Martínez was also picking up ground.  Martínez passed Edwards 8 meters from the finish, crossing two metres behind Quiñónez and a metre behind Richards.

Records
Prior to this competition, the existing world and Pan American Games records were as follows:

Schedule

Results
All times shown are in seconds.

Semifinal
Qualification: First 2 in each heat (Q) and next 2 fastest (q) qualified for the final.
Wind:Heat 1: -0.1 m/s, Heat 2: +0.4 m/s, Heat 3: -0.9 m/s

Final
The results were as follows

Wind: -1.0 m/s

References

Athletics at the 2019 Pan American Games
2019